Leroy Walker may refer to:
LeRoy Pope Walker (1817–1884), first Confederate States Secretary of War 
LeRoy T. Walker (1918–2012), first black president of the United States Olympic Committee